Alfred "Alfie" White (3 March 1909 – 1970) was an English professional footballer who played as an inside right. He made nearly 150 appearances in the English Football League with Derby County, Bournemouth & Boscombe Athletic - where the majority of those appearances were made - and Wrexham.

References

1909 births
1970 deaths
English footballers
Association football forwards
English Football League players
Derby County F.C. players
AFC Bournemouth players
Wrexham A.F.C. players